Hansan may refer to:

Places 
Hansan, Iran, a village in Sistan and Baluchestan Province, Iran
Hansan Island, Tongyeong, South Korea
Battle of Hansan Island
Hansan, Birbhum, a village in Birbhum district, West Bengal, India
Hansan (Vidhan Sabha constituency)
Hansan-myeon, Seocheon, South Chungcheong province in South Korea

Film 
 Hansan (film), a 2022 South Korean film based on Battle of Hansan Island